The 2002 NBL season was the 21st season of the National Basketball League. Two name changes occurred heading into the 2002 season, with Palmerston North now called Manawatu, and North Harbour now called Harbour. The Waikato Titans won the championship in 2002 to claim their second league title. In the final, Titans' forward Dillon Boucher made two free throws with 1.7 seconds to lift Waikato over the Nelson Giants 85–83.

Summary

Regular season standings

Playoff bracket

Awards

Statistics leaders
Stats as of the end of the regular season

Regular season
 NZ Most Valuable Player: Terrence Lewis (Canterbury Rams)
 Most Outstanding Guard: Terrence Lewis (Canterbury Rams)
 Most Outstanding NZ Guard: Terrence Lewis (Canterbury Rams)
 Most Outstanding Forward: John Whorton (Canterbury Rams)
 Most Outstanding NZ Forward/Centre: Ed Book (Nelson Giants)
 Scoring Champion: Ron Grady (Otago Nuggets)
 Rebounding Champion: John Whorton (Canterbury Rams)
 Assist Champion: Carlo Varricchio (Canterbury Rams)
 Rookie of the Year: Miles Pearce (Manawatu Jets)
 Coach of the Year: John Watson (Canterbury Rams)
 All-Star Five:
 G: Mark Dickel (Wellington Saints)
 G: Terrence Lewis (Canterbury Rams)
 F: Dillon Boucher (Waikato Titans)
 F: John Whorton (Canterbury Rams)
 C: Ed Book (Nelson Giants)

References

External links
 2002 ladder
 2002 teams
 POW – 15/5, 18/6, 7/8

National Basketball League (New Zealand) seasons
2002 in New Zealand  basketball